Ahoskie (YTB-804) was a United States Navy  named for Ahoskie, North Carolina.

Construction

The contract for Ahoskie was awarded 4 Mar 1969. She was laid down on 23 June 1969 at Sturgeon Bay, Wisconsin by Peterson Builders and launched 14 January 1970.

Operational history

Delivered to the Navy on 7 July 1970, Ahoskie was assigned to duty in the 6th Naval District and based at Charleston, South Carolina. She has spent her entire Navy career providing towing and other services to ships at Charleston.

Stricken from the Navy Directory 10 October 1995, ex-Ahoskie was sold to the City of Eastport, Maine Port Authority, 7 March 1996.

Circa 2000, the ship was in civilian service in Eastport, Maine. A wooden plaque on the stack identified it as the Ahoskie.

References

Notes

Sources

External links
 

 

Natick-class large harbor tugs
Ships built by Peterson Builders
1970 ships